Elections to the Landtag of Hesse are scheduled for 8 October 2023.

Opinion polling

Graphical summary

Party polling

References 

2023 elections in Germany
Elections in Hesse